Vito is a brand name of Leblanc, started in 1951.

History
Vito is a brand name for Leblanc USA, now part of Conn-Selmer USA. The Vito name was used for student through professional (Yanagisawa baritone saxophone) instruments. Leblanc USA was formed in 1946 by Vito Pascucci, and the French woodwind manufacturer, G. Leblanc Cie of France. To meet high demand, Leblanc USA started to manufacture clarinets in the US from plastic bodies and French keys. Eventually all of the parts were made in the US. These student clarinets were named  "Vito". 

Many, if not all, Vito flutes were "stencil" instruments manufactured in Japan by Yamaha. They were roughly the equivalent of a Yamaha YFL-200 series student instrument.

Some manufacturers of Vito instruments: 

 Beaugnier of Paris, France - Beaugnier made saxophones as Beaugnier and stencils labeled Leblanc, Vito and Noblet for the French market and U.S. export and also Selmer for U.K. export. 
 Yanagisawa of Japan - (Vito VSP: Soprano, Alto, Tenor and Baritone Saxophones). These Yanagisawa stencils are the most desirable saxophones sold under the Vito/Leblanc name and were marketed in the US as intermediate /professional model horns.  
 Yamaha of Japan (7131 model Alto and also Tenor Saxophones) 
 KHS/Jupiter brand (7133 model Alto and Tenor Saxophones).

Serial numbers

Vito Alto Saxophone Model 7131 Japan Stamped Serial Numbers.

These serial numbers ignore the leading zeros at the start of the serial numbers.

19701-500
1971501-2155
19722156-3529
19733530-4421
19744422-12000
197512001-25603
197625604-30827
197730828-33947
197833948-38844
197938845-42434
198042435-47975
198147976-52455
198252456-58306
198358307-62177
198462178-68524
198568525-72535
198672536-78579
198778580-85091
198885092-89758
198989759-501000
1990501098-510332
1991510333-511518
1992511519-515800
1993515801-519845
1994519846-526925
1995526926-533097
1996533098-537807
1997537808-552998
1998552999-560613
1999560614-575843
2000575842-587455
2001587456-624567
2002624568-654084

Vito Saxophone models
Vito 7133SS Soprano Sax
Vito 7131R(K) Alto Sax
Vito 7133 Alto Sax
Vito 7131T(K) Tenor Sax
Vito 7133T Tenor Sax
Vito 7190BA Baritone Sax
Vito 7136 Alto Sax
Vito 7140 Alto Sax

External links
Welcome to Conn-Selmer

Musical instrument manufacturing companies of the United States
Clarinet manufacturing companies